Emil Benčík (born 20 January 1933, in Zlatno) is a Slovak writer, journalist and translator. He established the feature radio documentary in Slovakia and created the first family radio series in the country called Čo nového, Bielikovci, which during its 17 years run established itself as one of the most popular programs in Slovakia's history with almost 1 in 2 Slovaks tuning in regularly.

In the 1950s he was a member of the notable journalistic generation centered on the newspaper Smena. From 1971 until 1990 he was the Chief editor of the Main desk of literary and drama broadcasting of the Czechoslovak radio in Bratislava.

For his journalistic and literary work, Emil Benčík has received numerous awards including the international Prize of Egon Erwin Kisch for his book Králi Ducha (Kings of the spirit). He is the first and only author to receive the Prize of Vojtech Zamarovský for radio broadcasting.

Biography 
Benčík was born on 20 January 1933 in Zlatno near Zlaté Moravce. He studied Slovak language and Russian language at Pedagogical faculty of the Comenius University in Bratislava. Later he worked as a teacher at elementary school in Lokca and at pedagogic gymnasium in Krupina. A long-time editor of the Slovak Radio in Bratislava, he has written many literary, biographical, dramatic and radio documentaries (features), series and cycles.

Work

Literary work 
 1971 – , spolu s K. Kowaliszyn.  (The home and the world – with K. Kowaliszyn)
 2003 –  (The first man of Czechoslovak spring)
 2007 –  (What the wind did not blow away)
 2008 –  (A ladder to the heaven)
 2010 –  (Kings of the spirit)
 2011 –  (Wealthy harvest of Andrej Chudoba)
 2014 -  (Zlatno hugged by the mountains)

Literary translations 
 1960 – Dawid Rubinowicz:  (Davids´ notebook)
 1962 – Włodzimierz Jaroszyński:  (The secret front)
 1972 – Alojzy Twardecki:  (School of the traitors)

Radio cycles 
 1997–2004 –  (People, facts, affairs)
 2003–2008 –  (Solo for...)
 2008–2011 –  (Such are the radio workers)

Radio features 
 1975 –  (Dramas of love and without love)
 1979 –  (To plant a tree)
 1978 –  (Eclipse of the Earth)
 1989 –  (Your majesty, money)
 1990 –  (Slovak bread)
 1990 –  (Every gypsy sings for himself)
 1991 –  (The bell Andrej)
 1991 –  (Life and death with the David´s star)
 1993 –  (We are, who we are)
 1993 –  (The first man of the Prague Spring)
 1994 –  (Day of the truth)
 1994 –  (Starry heaven above Jerusalem)
 1995 –  (The big book address all)
 1995 –  (The last day of war, the first day of peace)
 1996 –  (The Tehran conference, Yalta conference and Potsdam conference)
 1996 –  (The Nuremberg trial)
 1996 –  (After a good life, good death)
 1997 –  (According to heart)
 1997 –  (Operation Overlord)
 1997 – 
 1998 –  (Black days on air)
 1999 –  (Long night in Kremlin)
 2000 –  (What did the 20th century give us and what did it take away from us)
 2002 –  (With the head against the wall)
 2003 –  (Dancing above the gorge)
 2003 –   (Before the gate of hell)
 2004 –  (Pilot lights of hope)
 2005 –  (There was once a Velvet Revolution)
 2006 –  (Inglorious departure of the powerful)

Radio drama translations 
 Henryk Bardijevski: Koperník (Copernicus)
 Józef Gruda: Poľská suita, Albert, Kapela (Polish suite, Albert, The band)
 Andrzej Mularczyk: Z hlbín vôd, Balkón na Hlavnej ulici, Prespať zimu, Kuchynský vchod (From deep waters, Balcony on the broadway,  Be asleep all winter,   Kichen entrance) 
 Marian Grzesczak: Poľská symfónia (Polish symphony)

Awards 
 1998 – Golden medal of Alexander Dubček
 2001 – Prize of Vojtech Zamarovský
 2011 - Prize of Egon Erwin Kisch

Emil Benčík is also the holder of numerous other awards and prizes.

Monographies and studies 
Life and work of Emil Benčik is the subject of the following monographies, studies and scientific papers:

 Encyclopedia of Slovakia, Volume I. Encyclopedic office of the Slovak Academy of Sciences, Bratislava : Osveta, 1977. Page 177.
 Encyclopedia of Slovak dramatic arts, Volume I. Veda – publishing house of the Slovak Academy of Sciences, Bratislava, 1989. Page 103.
 Matovcik, A. et al.: Dictionary of Slovak writers of the 20th century. Publishing house SSS and SNK, Bratislava – Martin, 2001. Page 33.
 Dictionary of the Club of Czech and Slovak writers of non-fiction literature. Prague, 2003. Page 268.
 Kačala, J.: Language in Emil Benčík's book about three Slovak kings of spirit, Kultúra slova, volume 46, Bratislava, 2012.
 Herceg, M.: Emil Benčík – Ambidextrous journalistic personality. Dissertation, School of Journalism at the Faculty of Philosophy, Commenius University, Bratislava, 2006.
 Nemečková, L.: Radio document in the Slovak Radio - Emil Benčík, key personality of the founding generation, dissertation, Faculty of Mass Media at the Paneuropean University, evidence number FM-24684-7985, Bratislava, 2014.
 Chapters of history of the radio (Príspevky k dejinám rozhlasu). Slovak Radio, Bratislava, 2006.
 What was (and wasn't) on air (Čo bolo (i nebolo) v éteri). Slovak Radio, Bratislava, 2003.

See also 
 Slovak Radio

References

External links 
 The Centre for Information on Literature, online profile of Emil Benčík (in Slovak)

1933 births
People from Zlaté Moravce District
Slovak writers
Slovak journalists
Slovak translators
Comenius University alumni
Living people